Cameron Lindsay may refer to:

 Cameron Lindsay (footballer) (born 1992), New Zealand footballer
 Cameron Lindsay (rugby union) (born 1991), South African rugby union player